Alice Field (1903–1969) was a French Algerian stage and film actress.

Partial filmography

 Villa Destin (1921)
 Visages voilés... âmes closes (1921) - La seconde épouse de Hadji
 Atlantis (1930) - Madame Lambert
 La Maison de la Fléche (1930) - Ann Upcott
 Le refuge (1931) - Vanina
 Monsieur le duc (1931)
 You Will Be My Wife (1932) - Alice Ménard
 The Lacquered Box (1932)
 The Nude Woman (1932) - Princesse de Chabran
 Théodore et Cie (1933) - Gaby / Adrienne
 Les ailes brisées (1933) - Jacqueline
 Cette vieille canaille (1933) - Hélène
 La cinquième empreinte (1934) - Florence Forestier
 The Queen of Biarritz (1934) - Elenita
 Le vertige (1935) - Natacha Mikailovna
 La rosière des Halles (1935) - Renée Dunois
 Un soir de bombe (1935) - Hélène
 The Assault (1936) - Renée de Rould
 La dame de Vittel (1937) - Henriette Bourselet
 Police mondaine (1937) - Sylvia
 L'amour veille (1937) - Lucienne
 Neuf de trèfle (1938) - Miche Doulin
 The Tiger of Eschnapur (1938) - Sitha, la Maharanee
 The Indian Tomb (1938) - Sitha
 Camp Thirteen (1940) - Greta
 La loi du printemps (1942) - Hélène
 Finance noire (1943) - Anna
 Hyménée (1947) - Juliette
 Au p'tit zouave (1950) - Mme Billot
 A Certain Mister (1950) - Madame Léonard
 Darling Anatole (1954) - Caroline
 Me and the Forty Year Old Man (1965) - Mme de Trévise
 Pleins feux sur Stanislas (1965)
 Un amore (1965)
 Un garçon, une fille. Le dix-septième ciel (1966)
 La Grande Vadrouille (1966) - La prostituée (uncredited)
 Playtime (1967)

References

Bibliography 
 Goble, Alan. The Complete Index to Literary Sources in Film. Walter de Gruyter, 1999.

External links 
 

1903 births
1969 deaths
French stage actresses
French film actresses
People from Algiers
Pieds-Noirs
20th-century French women
Migrants from French Algeria to France